The 2012–13 season of the 2. Liga is the 20th season of the second-tier football league in Slovakia, since its establishment in 1993.

Twelve teams compete in the league, with bottom two sides being relegated to the Slovak third level.

Changes from last season

Team changes
Spartak Myjava were promoted to the Slovak First Football League after the 2011–12 season.
DAC Dunajská Streda were relegated from the Slovak First Football League after the 2011–12 season.
Slovan Duslo Šaľa, Partizán Bardejov Šamorín, and Baník Ružiná were promoted from the Slovak Third Football League after the 2011–12 season.
 LAFC Lučenec and Petržalka were relegated to the Slovak Third Football League after the 2011–12 season.
 Bodva Moldava and Ružomberok B were excluded from the league after the 2011–12 season.

Teams

Stadia and locations

League table

Results
The schedule consisted of three rounds. The two first rounds consisted of a conventional home and away round-robin schedule. The pairings of the third round were set according to the 2011–12 final standings. Every team played each opponent once for a total of 11 games per team.

First and second round

Top goalscorers
Updated through matches played 1 June 2013.

See also
2012–13 Slovak First Football League
2012–13 3. Liga (Slovakia)

Stats 
 List of transfers summer 2012
 List of transfers winter 2012–13

References

2012-13
Slovak
2